Broch is a type of Iron Age drystone hollow-walled structure found in Scotland.

Broch may also refer to:

Buildings
Broch of Clickimin, a broch near Lerwick, Shetland 
Broch of Culswick, an unexcavated coastal broch in Shetland 
Broch of Gurness, an Iron Age broch village on the northwest coast of Mainland, Orkney 
Broch of Mousa, a broch or round tower on the island of Mousa, Shetland 
Burroughston Broch, an Iron Age archaeological site on the island of Shapinsay, Orkney 
Edin's Hall Broch, a broch near Duns in the Scotland Borders

People
Brigitte Broch (born 1943), German born, Mexican set decorator 
Hermann Broch (1886–1951), Austrian writer
Lars Oftedal Broch (born 1939), Norwegian judge
Nicolai Cleve Broch (born 1975), Norwegian actor of theatre and film
Ole Jacob Broch (1818–1889), Norwegian mathematician, physicist, economist and politician
Theodor Broch (1904–1998), Norwegian lawyer and politician for the Labour Party

Places nicknamed "The Broch"
Fraserburgh, Aberdeenshire, Scotland
Burghead, Moray, Scotland

See also
Brach (disambiguation)
Brough (disambiguation)